Ted Noble (16 January 1865 – 4 May 1941) was an Australian cricketer. He played seven first-class matches for New South Wales in 1893/94 on a tour of New Zealand.

See also
 List of New South Wales representative cricketers

References

External links
 

1865 births
1941 deaths
Australian cricketers
New South Wales cricketers
Cricketers from Sydney